Gerard O'Halloran (born 22 June 1990) is an Irish hurler who played as a substitute corner-back for the Galway senior team.

O'Halloran joined the team during the 2012 championship.  An All-Ireland medalist in the under-21 grade, O'Halloran has won one Leinster medal in the senior grade as a non-playing substitute.

At club level O'Halloran plays with the Craughwell club.

References

1990 births
Living people
Craughwell hurlers
Galway inter-county hurlers
Connacht inter-provincial hurlers